Asajirus is a genus of marine tunicates. Asajirus indicus was found on the Antarctic Peninsula, West Of Palmer Archipelago at a depth of 2763-2818m.

Species
 Asajirus arcticus (Hartmeyer, 1923)
 Asajirus dichotomus (Monniot & Monniot, 1984)
 Asajirus eunuchus (Monniot F. & Monniot C., 1976)
 Asajirus gulosus (Monniot & Monniot, 1984)
 Asajirus hemisphericus (Monniot & Monniot, 1990)
 Asajirus indicus (Oka, 1913)
 Asajirus ledanoisi (Monniot C. & Monniot F., 1990)
 Asajirus ovirarus (Monniot & Monniot, 1990)

References

Stolidobranchia
Tunicate genera